The 1999 Patriot League men's basketball tournament was played at Christl Arena in West Point, New York and Cotterell Court in Hamilton, New York after the conclusion of the 1998–99 regular season.  defeated #3 seed , 67–63 in the championship game, to win its first Patriot League Tournament title. The Leopards earned an automatic bid to the 1999 NCAA tournament as #15 seed in the East region.

Format
All seven league members participated in the tournament, with teams seeded according to regular season conference record. Play began with the quarterfinal round.

Bracket

References

Tournament
Patriot League men's basketball tournament
Patriot League men's basketball tournament
Patriot League men's basketball tournament
Patriot League men's basketball tournament
Patriot League men's basketball tournament